Zoran Đurđević (born 3 April 1968) is a Serbian athlete. He competed in the men's triple jump at the 2000 Summer Olympics, representing Yugoslavia.

References

1968 births
Living people
Athletes (track and field) at the 2000 Summer Olympics
Serbian male triple jumpers
Olympic athletes of Yugoslavia
Place of birth missing (living people)